The Pentax SF-X is a camera model from the Japanese Pentax brand that was manufactured by the Asahi Optical Co., Ltd. (called PENTAX Corporation since 2002). It is also known as the Pentax SF-1 in the United States, and was first produced in 1987. It was Pentax's second Autofocus 35mm SLR after the Pentax ME F. It was the world's first AF SLR with built-in auto flash.

The SF-X comes from the same family as the slightly newer Pentax SF7/SF10.

Features
 Two auto-focus modes: single shot (focus priority) or continuous (servo)
 Shutter speed range, from 30 seconds to 1/2000th sec and Bulb.
 Exposure compensation
 Auto bracketing
 Interchangeable focusing screens
 Built-in diopter adjustment
 Motor drive transports at 1.8 frame/s
 Built-in Retractable TTL-Auto Flash (RTF) with AF spot beam projector

Exclusive Accessories (from SF1 Camera Sales Brochure)
 Interval Data Back F: 
  Substituted for the camera's back cover, this data back not only imprints the selected data on
  the film, but also controls the shutter release according to predesignated times and intervals. 
  The mode/data adjustment is push button easy and the large LCD window displays the selected data
  It offers six recording  modes: (1) Date (2) Time (3) A six-digit random number (4) One letter
  plus a two-digit count up number  (5) One letter plus a two-digit count down number  (6) blank – 
  or no imprint.  For interval shooting, it offers five modes: (1) Shooting start time (2) Interval
  length (3) Number of exposures  (4) Duration of Exposure and (5) Precharge signal of an external
  flash unit.

 Data Back F: 
  This data back imprints selected data clearly on the film from five recording modes: 
  (1) Year/Month/Day  (2) Month/Day/Year  (3) Day/Month/Year  (4) Day/Hour/Minute or 
  (AM-PM/Hour/Minute)  and (5) Off – no imprint.  A simple push button  control makes mode
  selection fast and easy, and the large LCD window displays the selected data.

 "AA" Battery Grip SF1: 
  This accessory grip replaces the standard Lithium Battery Grip and holds four " AA " size
  batteries. N-Cd batteries not usable

 Hotshoe Adapter F:  
  Attached to the SF1's hotshoe, this adapter allows you to position an accessory flash like 
  the AF400FTZ away from the camera via the 5P Sync Cord.  It also provides an easier access to 
  the shutter release button when using the AF080C Ring Light Set.

 Cable Switch F:  
  Connected to the release socket of the camera body, this one-meter long switch lets you release
  the shutter without touching the shutter release button, especially useful in preventing camera
  shake and vibration during extended-time exposures using its lock mechanism.

 Infrared Remote Release Cord F:  
  This cord connects a Pentax infrared receiver on the hotshoe to the release socket for remote 
  shutter release using a Pentax infrared transmitter.

See also
 List of Pentax products

SFX
135 film cameras
Pentax K-mount cameras